General elections were held in the Republic of Macedonia in April 2014 to elect the President and members of parliament. The first round of the presidential elections were held on 13 April, with incumbent president Gjorge Ivanov finishing first with 53% of the vote. However, as he did not receive the support of 50% of all registered voters, a second round was held on 27 April, alongside parliamentary elections, with Ivanov and the ruling coalition led by VMRO-DPMNE claiming victory as Ivanov was elected president and the VMRO-DPMNE won 61 of the 123 seats in the Assembly.

Background
The parliamentary elections were brought forward to coincide with the presidential election following the failure of coalition partners VMRO-DPMNE and DUI to agree on a combined presidential candidate.

President

Candidates
The incumbent president Gjorge Ivanov, supported by the governing party, the Internal Macedonian Revolutionary Organization – Democratic Party for Macedonian National Unity (VMRO-DPMNE), successfully nominated himself for reelection after collecting 63,253 signatures from citizens. The Social Democratic Union of Macedonia  (SDSM) candidate Stevo Pendarovski was nominated by the signatures of the opposition parties' members of parliament.

Campaign
The first round of the presidential election was held on 13 April. The candidates were Gjorge Ivanov (VMRO-DPMNE), Stevo Pendarovski (SDSM), Ilijaz Halimi (DPA), and Zoran Popovski (GROM). The ethnic Albanian party Democratic Union for Integration (DUI), a junior coalition member, campaigned for boycott of the presidential election, opposing VMRO-DPMNE's decision to run Ivanov for reelection.

SDSM's Pendarovski controversially visited Pristina where he criticised the government policies in terms of foreign policy and that Albania has the highest GDP in the region despite reports by institutions and other politicians saying it was Macedonia.

Parliament

Parties and coalitions
Fourteen political parties and coalitions contested the election, having submitted candidate lists for MPs in at least one of the six constituencies within the country and the three in the diaspora. Three among them, namely, VMRO-DPMNE, SDSM and DUI, submitted their candidate lists in all nine constituencies.

VMRO-DPMNE

SDSM

GROM
The Citizen Option for Macedonia (GROM)-led alliance consisted of the Citizen Option for Macedonia, the Liberal Party, the Serbian Progressive Party in Macedonia, the Union of Tito's Left Forces, and the Party of Free 
Democrats.

Campaign
SDSM's Zoran Zaev said that the election was about "choosing whether [the country] will support the fight for freedom and the right to a better life, or continue with state robbery." Prime Minister Nikola Gruevski said: "We need a majority so nobody can blackmail us and we can keep up with the programme...that would lead Macedonia into the EU and NATO."

Opinion polls

President

Parliament

Conduct
The second round of the election had accreditations given to 9,952 domestic and 550 foreign observers, as well as 283 translators, according to the State Election Commission.

The United States and European Union publicly urged political leaders to ensure the election was "credible and transparent," amidst complains by the SDSM.

Results

President
In second round voting, centres were open from 5:00 GMT to 17:00 GMT. Turnout was reported as 9.58% in the first three hours. Gjorge Ivanov was re-elected with 57% of the valid vote. Following the election, Stevo Pendarovski called for an investigation of the election by external observers.

Parliament
The incumbent government, led by VMRO-DPMNE, won 42.98% of the votes to claim victory ahead of SDSM with 25.34% and DUI with 13.71%. The 123 seats in the Assembly were won by six political parties and coalitions with VMRO-DPMNE winning 61 seats, SDSM winning 34 seats, DUI winning 19 seats, DPA winning 7 seats and GROM and NDP winning 1 seat each.

Reactions
After voting ended the SDSM's Zoran Zaev said that "SDSM and our opposition coalition will not recognise the election process, neither the presidential nor the parliamentary." He accused the government of "abusing the entire state system." It followed reports that Gruevski had warned that the SDSM was preparing, as an alibi, to react in such a manner to the election because they were due to lose the election.

Notes 
  The term "general elections" is used to refer to the presidential and parliamentary elections that were, incidentally, held on the same date since the Republic of Macedonia has a parliamentary system in which both elections are held separately.

References 

Elections in North Macedonia
Macedonia
Presidential election
Presidential elections in North Macedonia
April 2014 events in Europe